A Biographical Dictionary of Civil Engineers in Great Britain and Ireland discusses the lives of the people who were concerned with building harbours and lighthouses, undertook fen drainage and improved river navigations, built canals, roads, bridges and early railways, and provided water supply facilities. Volume One, published in 2002, covers the years from 1500 to 1830, while Volume Two, published in 2008, covers 1830 to 1890. The principal editor of the first volume was Professor A. W. Skempton, and the entries were written by a number of specialist historians.

An 18-page introduction in the first volume discusses the practice of civil engineering from 1500-1830. The work concludes with appendices discussing wages, costs and inflation, a chronology of major civil engineering works, and indices of places and names. Volume Two's introduction discusses the practice of civil engineering from 1830-1890.

See also
List of civil engineers

References
 
 

2002 non-fiction books
Civil Engineers, Biographical Dictionary of
British biographical dictionaries